Players have competed for the highest score for the video game Donkey Kong since its release in 1981. The competition became more prominent after it was covered in the 2007 documentary The King of Kong.

History 
On November 7, 1982, Billy Mitchell set the first widely recognized Donkey Kong world record of 874,300 points. The record stood until August 17, 2000, when it was surpassed by Tim Sczerby's score of 879,200. The competition became more prominent after it was covered in the 2007 documentary The King of Kong, which follows the rivalry between Mitchell and Steve Wiebe.

Wiebe began to compete with Hank Chien, a plastic surgeon from New York. In March 2010, Chien surpassed Wiebe's record score. Wiebe achieved a new record score on August 30, but Chien, who became known as Dr. Kong, reclaimed the world record and held it for four years. Chien improved his record four times, before withdrawing from competitive play. 

In September 2014, Robbie Lakeman overtook Chien's  score. Lakeman had practiced for two and a half years and was spurred by a bet that he could earn a score within the game's top twenty. He would often stream his attempts live on Twitch, a streaming service, though his initial world record game was performed offline. At the time, a higher record had been set by Dean Saglio, but on an emulated version of the game rather than a physical arcade cabinet. Lakeman overtook his own record in December and again in June 2015.

In September 2015, Wes Copeland bested Lakeman for the high score. Lakeman reclaimed the record within six hours. Copeland retook the record in January 2016. Shortly after, Lakeman announced his withdrawal from competitive play, though he regained the record in December 2017, and surpassed it in February 2018.

On March 30th, 2010, the American rapper Eminem reported a score of 465,800 with photo proof, which would have put him within the top 30 worldwide at the time. As of March 2023, with increasing competition, this score would now sit in 191st place; the score was never officially submitted.

In 2018, Twin Galaxies, which officiates high-score designations, vacated Mitchell's Donkey Kong high scores and banned his future participation after stating that three of his Donkey Kong million-point high scores had not been made on original, unmodified circuit boards. A frame-by-frame analysis of Mitchell's games suggested they were played on an emulator. However, in 2020, Guinness World Records reversed their decision and reinstated Mitchell's previous records, based on new evidence including eyewitness reports and expert testimonials. Twin Galaxies did not reinstate Mitchell's scores.

Timeline

Other World Record categories 
There are many other categories for Donkey Kong besides highest score. One of the most popular is the "No Hammer Challenge" where competitors try to get the highest score without using the hammer found in the game. The current world record in this category was set by Jeff Wolfe on July 8, 2008, with a score of 735,100. Some other categories include most points for different levels, fewest points, and most wall jumps on a rivet board.

Events 

The Kong-Off is an annual competitive Donkey Kong tournament hosted by Richie Knucklez, to date held from 2010 to 2019. The inaugural Kong-Off was won by Hank Chien in New Jersey. Jeff Willms won a small cash prize at the 2013 Kong-Off 3 tournament, which was held in Denver between 22 competitors. Willms, a professional Software Engineer, had previously won the Kong-Off 2. Kong-Offs 4 & 5 were held in Pittsburgh, with Hank Chien winning his 2nd title, followed by Robbie Lakeman's first victory the following year. Kong-Offs 6 & 7 were held in Banning, California. Robbie Lakeman won his 2nd consecutive title at Kong-Off 6, followed by Jeff Wolfe's first win at Kong-Off 7.

Notes

References 

Video game culture
Donkey Kong (video game) competitions
Games and sports introduced in 1981